Sacha Mngomezulu is a South African rugby union player for the  in the Currie Cup. His regular position is fly-half.

Rugby career

Stormers
Mngomezulu was named in the  squad for the 2021 Currie Cup Premier Division.

National team
Eligible to play with the England team through his father, Nick Feinberg, he finally chose to play for South Africa and, in October 2022, he was included in the squad for the Springboks' year-end tour.

References

South African rugby union players
Living people
2002 births
Rugby union fly-halves
Western Province (rugby union) players
Stormers players